Bunmi Famosaya is a Government officer. He is the Chairman, Civil Service Commission,  Ekiti State Nigeria and former Head of Service, Ekiti State. He is a native of Osin Ekiti in Oye Local Government, Ekiti State, Nigeria. He previously held the office of Head of Service between 2010 and 2014.

Education 
Alumnus of Obafemi Awolowo University, Harvard University and Christ's School Ado Ekiti.

 He has attended and obtained various certificates from institutions both in Nigeria and abroad.
Harvard Kennedy School, Harvard University, where he obtained a Certificate in Creating Collaborative Solutions.
 African Development Bank Training Institute Abidjan, Côte d'Ivoire, where he obtained a Certificate in Procurement Planning and Management and another Certificate in Loan Disbursement, Loan Administration and Management.
 He also attended Crown Agent International Training Institute, Worthing East, Sussex, UK where he obtained a Certificate in People Management and another Certificate in Essential Management Skill.
 In the same vain, he equally attended Royal Institute of Public Administration SWI London where he obtained a Certificate in Improving Organization Effectiveness.
 He also attended the National Institute for Policy and Strategic Studies, Kuru -Jos where he obtained the Membership of the National Institute (mni). He also attended Public Service College, Abuja where he obtained a Certificate in Public Speaking Technique.

Professional history 
Bunmi Famosaya started his career in 
 Health Management Board Ondo State 1980(Administration officer, Assistant Secretary.
 He was later posted to Governor's Office Ondo State (1985) to the Political and Economic Affairs Department.
 Health Service Rehabilitation Project Ondo State (1994) as Assistant Director. 
 Ondo State Ministry of Health as Assistant Director Finance & Supplies. 
 Director Ondo State Ministry of Health. 
 Secretary to Joint Assets and Liabilities Sharing Committee (1996) Ekiti State .
 Permanent Secretary (2003), General Administration Department, in Governor's Office Ekiti State . 
 Permanent Secretary (2004), Ministry of Works and Transport Ekiti State . 
 Permanent Secretary Ministry of Finance and Economic Development Ekiti State 
 Head of Service Ekiti State (2010-2014)

References

Living people
1956 births
Obafemi Awolowo University alumni
People from Ekiti State